Resiutta is a comune (municipality) in the Province of Udine, in the Italian region Friuli-Venezia Giulia, located about  northwest of Trieste and about  north of Udine.

The municipality of Resiutta contains the frazione Povici.

Resiutta borders the following municipalities: Chiusaforte, Moggio Udinese, Resia, Venzone.

Demographic evolution

Gallery

References

Cities and towns in Friuli-Venezia Giulia